Sabatinca weheka is a species of moth belonging to the family Micropterigidae.  This species is endemic to New Zealand where it can be found near Lake Matheson and also on Secretary Island. This species is very similar in appearance to S. heighwayi  in both their larval and adult forms but the adults of S. weheka differ as they are darker and more strongly marked on the forewings and have a dark brownish base colour to their wings. This species is on the wing from the middle to the end of October and lives in forest with a high rainfall. The larval host species is the liverwort Plagiochila deltoidea.

Taxonomy 
This species was first described by George Gibbs in 2014 using specimens collected at Lake Matheson by Gibbs. The male holotype specimen is held in the New Zealand Arthropod Collection.

This species is very similar in appearance to S. heighwayi however its morphology is distinctive and this distinction has been confirmed by gene sequencing.

Description 
The larvae of this species is very similar in appearance to the larvae of S. heighwayi which are a pale yellowish-green colour.

Gibbs described the adults of this species as follows:
The adults of this species differ from S. heighwayi as they have darker, more strongly marked appearance to their forewings with a dark brownish base colour.

Distribution

This species is endemic to New Zealand and is known from Lake Matheson in Westland and also Grono Spur on Secretary Island in Fiordland.

Life cycle
This species overwinters in its pupa state and emerges in October. This species is on the wing only from the middle to the end of October. The larvae mature until January when they pupate.

Host plants and habitat

This species inhabits forest with a high rainfall. The larval host species is the liverwort Plagiochila deltoidea which, as a result of the high rainfall in the localities where S. weheka is found, can grow up the trunks of trees.

References

Micropterigidae
Moths described in 2014
Endemic fauna of New Zealand
Moths of New Zealand
Taxa named by George Gibbs
Endemic moths of New Zealand